Trancers 4: Jack of Swords is a 1994 American sci-fi fantasy adventure film starring Tim Thomerson as Jack Deth. The film also features Stephen Macht and Stacie Randall. It was filmed back-to-back with Trancers 5: Sudden Deth in and around a castle in Romania that was also used in another Full Moon Entertainment produced film series called Subspecies.

The film has been released on DVD through the Trancers boxset.

Synopsis
Following his adventures in the Los Angeles of the 1980s, Jack Deth (Tim Thomerson) has returned to his own time, the 23rd century. Having lost his first wife Lena, and finding out that he's lost his other wife Alice to none other than Harris, Deth agrees to another assignment in the past.

While heading out for another assignment, something (a Solonoid from a previous assignment) hiding in the time portal causes the TCL chamber to go awry. Jack finds himself in a whole new dimension, a kingdom of the technological level of medieval Europe. The physics of this world render most of Deth's technological devices nonfunctional Here, he meets a parallel to Trancers called Nobles, who subsist on the life force of the mortals indigenous to this world. 

Jack assists a rebel group known as the Tunnel Rats, who desire to overthrow the villanous Lord Caliban (Clabe Hartley). The leaders of the Nobles' son, Prospero (Ty Miller) rebels against the other aristorcrats.  To stop the Trancers of this world, and return himself to his own dimension, Jack must quest to find the mystical Diamond in the Castle of Unrelenting Terror, an item which Lord Caliban is also hunting. The movie ends on a cliffhanger.

Cast
 Tim Thomerson as Jack Deth
 Stacie Randall as Lyra
 Ty Miller as Prospero
 Terri Ivens as Shaleen
 Mark Arnold as Lucius
 Clabe Hartley as Lord Caliban
 Alan Oppenheimer as Farr
 Lochlyn Munro as Sebastian
 Jeff Moldovan as Harson
 Stephen Macht as Harris
 Ruxandra Enescu as Titania
 Adrian Pintea as Borgia
 Rona Hartner as Tessa
 Ion Haiduc as Angelo
 Razvan Popa as Provost
 Crinuta Popescu as Caliban's Girl
 Costel Constantin as The Torturer
 Mihai Dinvale as Crossbow Noble
 Jacqueline R. Clay as The Bartender
 Albu Ioan as Solonoid #1
 Jake Roberts as Solonoid #2
 Jake McKinnon as Chlourofiend (uncredited)

Reception
Entertainment Weekly found the film a bore and stated that fans of the first three Trancers movies would be disappointed. However, Creature Feature gave the film 3 out of 5 stars, rating it higher than the first three movies. TV Guide gave the movie two stars, saying the sequel does as well as can be imagined and praised Thomerson's acting, calling him an "underappreciated physical comedian". Peter David's Silver gave the movie 2.5 out of 5 stars when judged on the B-Movie scale and 2 out of 5 stars when judged on a general scale. They noted that the movie was funnier than its predecessors, but that the acting outside of Thomerson's left much to be desired. It was recommended for fans of the series.

Production
Full Moon Entertainment moved its studios to Romania as post-Soviet film tax incentives were too great to resist. This benefit accounted for the change of setting. It was filmed at the same time as Trancers V. The stunt work was noted as impressive, and obtained much cheaper by local talent than would cost in America. Also offered cheaper were sound stages, waivers of location fees and extras working very cheaply.

References

External links
 

1994 films
1994 action films
1994 horror films
1994 science fiction films
1990s English-language films
1990s science fiction action films
1990s science fiction horror films
American science fiction action films
American science fiction horror films
American sequel films
Films directed by David Nutter
Films shot in Romania
Trancers (film series)
1990s American films